Lacrimosa No. 2 is a sacred composition for soprano, women's choir and chamber orchestra by Krzysztof Penderecki, completed in 2018, setting the liturgical text Lacrimosa from the Requiem mass.

History 
Penderecki wrote Lacrimosa No. 2 on a commission by the Pomeranian Philharmonic. He set the liturgical text Lacrimosa from the Requiem mass which he had set first in his Polish Requiem, for a soprano soloist, women's choir and chamber orchestra. It was published by Schott. The duration is given as two minutes.

References 

Compositions by Krzysztof Penderecki
Contemporary classical compositions
Choral compositions
2018 compositions
Christian music